Water Pik, Inc. (also Waterpik) is an American oral health products company based in Fort Collins, Colorado. A subsidiary of Church & Dwight, it produces personal and oral health care products such as oral irrigators and pulsating shower heads.

Waterpik began in 1962 as Aqua Tec Corporation. with the invention of the oral irrigator. It was acquired by Teledyne Inc in 1967 and was spun off as a public company, Water Pik Technologies, in 1999. It was then bought by the private equity firm Carlyle Group in 2006 in a deal valued at $380 million. At this point Water Pik had six major facilities in the US and Canada. Carlyle sold it the following year to EG Capital.

In 2012, Waterpik was reported to have 1,400 employees. In 2013 it was sold to MidOcean Partners and Vulcan Capital. In 2017, MidOcean agreed to sell the company for $1 billion to Church & Dwight. At the time of the sale announcement, it was reported that the company had "$265 million of revenue in the fiscal year ended June 30, about 70% of which came from its water flosser products".

References

 
1962 establishments in Colorado
Companies based in Colorado
Church & Dwight brands